Rreze Abdullahu  Ferizaj, Kosovo is a Kosovo Albanian writer. She is best known for Nuk du luftë (I don't want war), a wartime diary she kept as a child during the 1999 Kosovo conflict. The diary is written in her native Gheg dialect.

References

Living people
People from Ferizaj
20th-century Albanian writers
21st-century Albanian writers
Albanian women writers
Albanian-language writers
Postmodern writers
1990 births
Diarists